Asiab (also Romanized as Āsīāb; also known as Mashhad Kheybar) is a village in Jahangiri Rural District, in the Central District of Masjed Soleyman County, Khuzestan Province, Iran. At the 2006 census, its population was 19, in 6 families.

References 

Populated places in Masjed Soleyman County